AFN Berlin was a US military broadcast station located at Podbielskiallee 23 in Berlin-Dahlem. It started broadcasting at noon on August 4, 1945, with the Rhapsody in Blue by George Gershwin. The TV studio was located on Saargemünder Strasse, across from the Berlin Brigade Headquarters compound.

During the Berlin Blockade AFN Berlin started broadcasting around the clock. After the building of the Berlin Wall AFN Berlin radio then stayed on the air 24 hours until July 1994. TV programming was normally from 15:00 to 01:00 weekdays and 12:00 to 01:00 on weekends during the mid 1970s.

AFN Berlin had three stations:
 a medium-wave AM station at 1107 kHz
 an FM station at 87.85 MHz (adjusted to 87.9 MHz at a later stage, called 88FM)
 a TV station on UHF channel E29 (US channel 25) broadcasting in NTSC (thus requiring a multistandard set for German viewers) with a low-power transmitter limited to southwestern Berlin

Until November 23, 1978, the AM frequency was 935 kHz. Due to the agreements in the Geneva Frequency Plan the frequency was changed to 1107 kHz.

On July 15, 1994, AFN Berlin broadcast a 3-hour special broadcast on both radio frequencies, which was transmitted live into 54 countries. Afterwards, seconds before 14:00, AFN Berlin ceased transmitting after playing a rendition of "The Star-Spangled Banner" performed by William Rivelli.

Productions

Radio (88FM) 
Musical programs:
An early morning show, host unknown, in late 1950s, (Mon–Fri - 7 am–8 am); theme song: an abbreviated version of: "s'Wonderful" by Ray Conniff.
Before noon show, hosted by Mark Marcus, in late 1950s, (Mon–Fri 11am-noon), popular music 
Early afternoon: host unknown, weekdays 1 pm–2 pm, country & western music.
Frolic at Five, host Georg Hudak early to mid 1950s and later unknown host, mid 1950s, (Mon-Fri - 5 pm–6 pm); theme song: "9:20 Special" recorded May 30, 1945 by Harry James.
Music in the Air, host unknown, late 1950s, (weekdays 7 pm–8 pm), light music. 
Frolic at Jazz, host unknown, (Saturdays 6 pm–7 pm); Theme tune: "Skinned & Skinned Again" by Woody Herman. 
The Juice
 Disco
 Special live broadcasts from the German-American Volksfest at the Hüttenweg in Berlin-Dahlem and from the Day of Open House at the Tempelhof Central Airport (TCA)
An Afternoon Show (Mon-Fri)

Television 

Berlin Tonight (daily news) 
Berlin PM (interview show) 
Berlin Tonight Late Edition (late news) 
Discover Berlin (trailers of Berlin sights)
The Berlin Ramblers (30-minute live country music show, 1968 one Saturday afternoon monthly)
Berlin Midday
Snowball Satellite (Christmas)
P.L.P.'s Workshop (children's show Saturday mornings)
Forum (news magazine)
Get it Together (TV quiz show)
. Berlin Sports Roundup (Weekly Sports program hosted by SP4 Jim Rose 73–75)

People of AFN Berlin

Radio

TV

See also 
 American Forces Network
 AFN Bremerhaven
 AFN Frankfurt
 AFN Munich

External links 

 unofficial website about AFN Berlin (mirror site)
 Page of the 6941st Gd Bn Kameradschaftsbund about AFN Berlin (de)
 AFN Berlin.com private website about AFN Berlin

 Last location of AFN Berlin

American Forces Network
English-language radio stations
Defunct radio stations in Germany
Mass media in Berlin
1945 establishments in Germany
1994 disestablishments in Germany
Radio stations established in 1945
Radio stations disestablished in 1994